Bongloor is a village and panchayat in Rangareddy district, Telangana, India. It comes under Ibrahimpatnam mandal.

It is 5 kilometers away from Hyderabad city. The Outer Ring Road, Hyderabad is passing through this village and has a major junction located here. State Bank of Hyderabad has its branch in the village. It was one of the three options for the site of the Hyderabad Airport, the others being Nadergul and Shamshabad, the selected location.

Education
Visvesvaraya College of Engineering and Technology has its campus at Bongloor crossroads.

Transport
 277T,403,436 from Imlibun Bus Station                                                                                 
 279 from Secunderabad  

Rajiv Gandhi International Airport is 29 kilometers away.

References

Villages in Ranga Reddy district